Sgt. Bilko is a 1996 American military comedy film directed by Jonathan Lynn and written by Andy Breckman.  It is an adaptation of the 1950s television series The Phil Silvers Show, often informally called Sgt. Bilko, or simply Bilko, and stars Steve Martin, Dan Aykroyd, Phil Hartman and Glenne Headly.

Plot
Master Sergeant Ernest G. Bilko is in charge of the motor pool at Fort Baxter, a small United States Army base that develops new military technology. Exploiting this position, he directs a number of scams, ranging from gambling to renting out military vehicles. His commanding officer, Colonel John Hall, overlooks Bilko's money-making schemes, as he is more concerned with problems in the "Hover Tank" that the base is designing.

Major Colin Thorn, an officer from the U.S. Army Inspector General's office, arrives at the camp and begins to scrutinize Bilko's record. Officially, Thorn is at Fort Baxter to conduct a general inspection and determine if the base should remain open in light of recent defense cutbacks. He is also determined to get revenge on Bilko to settle an old score the two have from Fort Dix, where Thorn was nearly court-martialed after a fixed boxing match which resulted in Thorn being shipped off to Greenland in the belief that he tried to fix the fight.

Bitter and unprincipled, Thorn is not above breaking the law to ruin Bilko. He attempts to steal Bilko's long-time fiancée Rita, whom Bilko has stood up at the altar more than a dozen times. Rita is tired of waiting and gives Bilko 30 days to win her back or lose her for good.

Bilko, with the help of newly assigned Private First Class Wally Holbrook, devises a means of avoiding Thorn's attempt to transfer him to Greenland:  He rigs a demonstration of the base's malfunctioning Hover Tank, staged before a four-star general and numerous government officials. Since Thorn had deliberately tried to sabotage the tank the previous night, he confronts Bilko, Hall, and the general, loudly insulting Bilko and Hall. While ranting, he confesses to sabotaging the Hover Tank. Thorn is sent off again to Greenland.

The last day of Rita's ultimatum has come. Just as she sadly begins to write Bilko off forever, Rita hears men outside her house, serenading her with a  favorite song of hers and Bilko's. Looking out, she sees Bilko and his platoon. Bilko asks Rita to marry him, and she accepts. The next day is their wedding day, but Rita shows up late, due to a mix-up over Daylight Saving Time. After they play another card game (if Bilko wins, they get married), they finally get married. Unknown to Bilko, Rita is holding four aces in her hand.

Cast
Steve Martin as Master Sergeant Ernest G. Bilko
Dan Aykroyd as Col. John T. Hall
Phil Hartman as Maj. Colin Thorn
Glenne Headly as Rita Robbins
John Marshall Jones as Sgt. Henshaw
Pamela Adlon as Sgt. Raquel Barbella
Austin Pendleton as Maj. Ebersole
Chris Rock as 1st Lt. Oster
Cathy Silvers as 1st Lt. Monday
Steve Park as Capt. Moon
Debra Jo Rupp as Mrs. Hall
Richard Herd as Gen. Tennyson
Dan Ferro as Spc. Tony Morales
John Ortiz as Spc. Luis Clemente
Max Casella as Spc. Dino Paparelli
Daryl Mitchell as Pfc. Walter "Wally" T. Holbrook
Mitchell Whitfield as Pfc. Mickey Zimmerman
Travis Tritt as Self

Casting

Albert Brooks was offered the role of Ernest G. Bilko, but turned it down.

Reception 
On the film-critic aggregator Rotten Tomatoes, Sgt. Bilko received a 31% positive ratings from 39 reviews, with an average rating of 4.6/10. On Metacritic, it has a score of 47 out of 100 based on reviews from 23 critics, indicating "mixed or average reviews". Gene Siskel and Roger Ebert gave it two thumbs up on their television show. Ebert praised Steve Martin's performance and enjoyed "all the little jokes hidden in the corners" of the movie. Audiences surveyed by CinemaScore gave the film a grade of "B+" on a scale of A+ to F. It won the award for Worst Resurrection of a TV Show at the 1996 Stinkers Bad Movie Awards. It also failed at the box office.

References

External links

Sgt. Bilko at Rotten Tomatoes

1996 films
1996 comedy films
American comedy films
1990s English-language films
Films about con artists
Films about the United States Army
Films based on television series
Films directed by Jonathan Lynn
Films produced by Brian Grazer
Films scored by Alan Silvestri
Imagine Entertainment films
Military humor in film
Films with screenplays by Andy Breckman
Universal Pictures films
1990s American films